DMI–St. Eugene university is a multi-campus private university in Zambia, that is affiliated with the Roman Catholic Archdiocese of Lusaka. The university is administered by the Daughters of Mary Immaculate.

Location
The university maintains three campuses: The first campus to be established is the Lusaka Campus, also referred to as the Woodlands Campus.

Overview
It is named after Saint Eugène de Mazenod. It offers diplomas,  bachelor's and master's degrees as well as research programmes. The Very Reverend Father Dr. Dr.Jesuadimai Emmanuel Arulraj (J.E. Arul Raj), the founder and Chairman of the DMI-Group of Institutions, serves as the Chancellor of the university. The university is recognised and is accredited by the Zambia Ministry of Higher Education. It started to function as a university in 2007.

The university is affiliated with other institutions of learning in the DMI Group of Institutions, in other countries, including India, Tanzania, Malawi and South Sudan.

History
In 2014, the university signed a contract with the Zambian government, and is participating in a nationwide Zambian government programme to train 2,000 mathematics and science  teachers. The university is also participating in upgrading the qualifications of elementary and secondary educators in Zambia.

Courses

Diploma courses
The following diploma courses are on offer, as of May 2020.

 Diploma in Computer Science
 Diploma in Hardware and Networking
 Diploma in Information Technology
 Diploma in Animation and Multimedia
 Diploma in Secondary Education
 Diploma in Business Administration
 Diploma in Sales and Marketing
 Diploma in Banking and Finance
 Diploma in Accounting and Finance
 Diploma in Monitoring and Evaluation

Undergraduate courses
The undergraduate courses on offer include the following.

 Bachelor of Science in Food and Nutrition
 Bachelor of Science in Electronics and Communication
 Bachelor of Science in Renewable Energy
 Bachelor of Science in Visual Communication
 Bachelor of Science in Home Science
 Bachelor of Science in Secondary Education
 Bachelor of Science in Journalism and Mass Communication
 Bachelor of Science in Graphics and Multimedia
 Bachelor of Business Administration
 Bachelor of Commerce
 Bachelor of Computer Science

Postgraduate courses
The following postgraduate courses are on offer at the university as of May 2020.

 Master of Business Administration
 Doctor of Philosophy in selected fields.

See also
Education in Zambia

References

External links
Official Website
‘They’ve Got Class!’: A policy research report on Zambian teachers’ attitudes to their own profession As of 2001. 

Universities in Zambia
2007 establishments in Zambia
Educational institutions established in 2007